The 16th Central Committee of the Chinese Communist Party was in session from 2002 to 2007. It held seven plenary sessions. It was set in motion by the 16th National Congress of the Chinese Communist Party. The 15th Central Committee preceded it.  It was followed by the 17th Central Committee of the Chinese Communist Party.

It elected the 16th Politburo of the Chinese Communist Party in 2002. There were seven plenary sessions held in the five-year period facilitated by the Politburo.

Members
In stroke order of surnames:

Brief chronology
1st Plenary Session
Date: November 15, 2002
Location: Beijing
Significance: Significance: Hu Jintao was elected General Secretary, Jiang Zemin was appointed Chairman of the Central Military Commission. A 25-members Politburo, a 9-members Politburo Standing Committee and a 7-members Secretariat with Zeng Qinghong as first-ranking secretary were elected. Wu Guanzheng was appointed secretary of the Central Commission for Discipline Inspection. Wen Jiabao entered the Politburo Standing Committee for the first time.
2nd Plenary Session
Date: February 24–25, 2003
Location: Beijing
Significance: The meeting approved lists of nominees for top posts of the 10th National People's Congress and the 10th National Committee of the Chinese People's Political Consultative Conference.
3rd Plenary Session
Date: October 11–14, 2003
Location: Beijing
Significance: A Decision of the CCP Central Committee on Certain Issues Concerning the Socialist Market Economy System and a Proposal by the CCP Central Committee to Revise Parts of the State Constitution were adopted. Regulations to facilitate private enterprise were called for.
4th Plenary Session
Date: September 16–19, 2004
Location: Beijing
Significance: Hu Jintao delivered a report on behalf of the Politburo, Zeng Qinghong delivered an explanatory speech on the Decision of the CCP Central Committee on Strengthening the Party's Governance Capability. Jiang Zemin announced his retirement, and Hu Jintao was appointed Chairman of the Central Military Commission, with Xu Caihou replacing him as vice-chairman.
5th Plenary Session
Date: October 8–11, 2005
Location: Beijing
Significance: Hu Jintao delivered a report on behalf of the Politburo, Wen Jiabao made a report on the guidelines for the 11th Five-Year Plan. The goal to promote "social harmony" was launched. The official communique stressed on the "building of democratic rule of law, justice, sincerity, amity, vitality, stability and order", and simultaneously fostered the promotion of cross-straits relations with Taiwan and the "reunification of the motherland"; on March 15, an Anti-Secession Law had been adopted.
6th Plenary Session
Date: October 8–11, 2006
Location: Beijing
Significance: Hu Jintao delivered a report on behalf of the Politburo, Wu Bangguo made an explanatory speech on the Decision of the CCP Central Committee on Certain Major Issues in the Building of an Harmonious Socialist Society.
7th Plenary Session
Date: October 9–12, 2007
Location: Beijing
Significance: Preparations for the Party's 17th National Congress were made. The Scientific Development Concept was officially endorsed. Former Mayor of Shanghai Chen Liangyu, close ally to Jiang Zemin and rival to Hu Jintao, and former Mayor of Qingdao Du Shicheng were expelled from the Party for alleged corruption.

External links
 16th Central Committee of the CCP, People's Daily Online.

Central Committee of the Chinese Communist Party
2002 establishments in China
2007 disestablishments in China